John Clement Schulte (September 8, 1896 – June 28, 1978) was an American catcher and longtime coach in professional baseball.

Schulte's professional playing career began in 1915. It lasted for 15 seasons and was interrupted by two years (1917–18) in military service during World War I. He played for five Major League Baseball teams over all or parts of five seasons: the St. Louis Browns ( and ), St. Louis Cardinals, Philadelphia Phillies, Chicago Cubs and Boston Braves (1932). Altogether, he appeared in 192 games, hitting .262 with 98 hits, including 15 doubles, four triples and 14 home runs. His best year, as a second-string catcher for the  Cardinals, saw him set personal bests in most offensive categories. In Chicago, he was a reserve catcher on the 1929 National League champions and played under Joe McCarthy, whom he would later serve as a longtime coach.

He coached 15 full seasons (1934–48) in the Bronx, serving under Bill Dickey, Johnny Neun and Bucky Harris after McCarthy's retirement in May 1946. The Yankees won seven World Series titles and eight American League pennants during Schulte's decade and a half as a coach.

When McCarthy retired for the final time on June 23, Schulte was reassigned to scouting duties by the Red Sox. He coached in minor league baseball for the Yankees' Kansas City Blues Triple-A affiliate before returning to scouting with the Cleveland Indians. In 1961, he scouted Tommy John and brought him to Cleveland for a workout, after which the team signed him.

Johnny Schulte died in St. Louis, Missouri, at the age of 81.

Notes

External links

Johnny Schulte at SABR (Baseball BioProject)

 

1896 births
1978 deaths
Baseball players from Missouri
Boston Braves players
Boston Red Sox coaches
Boston Red Sox scouts
Buffalo Bisons (minor league) players
Chicago Cubs coaches
Chicago Cubs players
Cleveland Indians scouts
Los Angeles Angels (minor league) players
Louisville Colonels (minor league) players
Major League Baseball bullpen coaches
Major League Baseball catchers
Mobile Bears players
Newark Bears (IL) players
New York Yankees coaches
Newport News Shipbuilders players
Oklahoma City Senators players
People from Madison County, Missouri
Philadelphia Phillies players
St. Louis Browns players
St. Louis Cardinals players
San Antonio Bears players
Syracuse Stars (minor league baseball) players
Terre Haute Browns players
Terre Haute Highlanders players
Toledo Mud Hens players
Wheeling Stogies players